Phyllonorycter caudasimplex is a moth of the family Gracillariidae. It is known from Nigeria.

The length of the forewings is 3.2 mm. The forewings are ochreous brown with white markings. The hindwings are fuscous with a long, light fuscous fringe. Adults are on wing in late December.

The larvae were recorded on Dombeya acutangula and Ruizia cordata, but these records are based on a misidentification of Phyllonorycter ruizivorus. They probably mine the leaves of their host plant.

References

Endemic fauna of Nigeria
Moths described in 1980
caudasimplex
Insects of West Africa
Moths of Africa